Tandem Aero was a passenger charter airline based in Chişinău, Moldova, which existed from 1998 to 2019.

Operations
The airline's air operator's certificate permitted the transport of passengers, goods and mail as of July 2007. Apart from passenger charter work, the airline at times operated contracted flights for Air Moldova to Sochi, Bucharest, and Kyiv. In February 2015, the arrangement with Air Moldova came to an end. 

In the airline's final years, it attempted to pivot its business model into scheduled passenger operations. It purchased a second-hand Airbus A320, with which it flew a single scheduled route, once per week, between Moldova and Tel Aviv. However, before the airline could expand any further, its operator's certificate was revoked by the Moldovan Government in April 2019, citing safety concerns. This effectively brought the airline to an end.

Fleet 
By 2019, Tandem Aero's fleet consisted of the following:

At some point, the airline also owned and operated Ilyushin Il-18 and Antonov An-24 aircraft.

Destinations 
By the closure of the airline in April 2019, Tandem Aero was operating the following route:

External links

References

Defunct airlines of Moldova
Airlines established in 1998
Airlines disestablished in 2019
1998 establishments in Moldova
2019 disestablishments in Moldova